Mortantsch is a municipality in the district of Weiz in the Austrian state of Styria.

Geography
Mortantasch lies next to Weiz.

References

Cities and towns in Weiz District